Kohleria hirsuta, the woolly kohleria, is a species of flowering plant in the family Gesneriaceae, native to northern South America, and introduced to the Dominican Republic. In 1993, as its synonym Kohleria eriantha, it gained the Royal Horticultural Society's Award of Garden Merit as a hothouse plant, but the award appears to have been recently revoked.

Subtaxa
The following varieties are accepted:
Kohleria hirsuta var. hirsuta
Kohleria hirsuta var. longipes (Benth.) L.P.Kvist & L.E.Skog

References

Gesnerioideae
Flora of Ecuador
Flora of Colombia
Flora of northern South America
Plants described in 1848